Domaszék is a village in Csongrád county, in the Southern Great Plain region of southern Hungary.

Geography
It lies 12 km west from the city of Szeged in the Southern Great Plain. It is bordered by the Székestói Canal from east and north.

Twin towns – sister cities

Domaszék is twinned with:
 Bački Vinogradi (Subotica), Serbia
 Lueta, Romania
 Wolbrom, Poland

References

External links

Official website 

Populated places in Csongrád-Csanád County